The Landfall 39 (Amy) is a Taiwanese sailboat that was designed by Ron Amy and first built in 1974.

The design is sometimes confused with the C&C Design/Robert Perry-designed 1985 boat of the same name, although the two designs are unrelated.

Production
The design was built by Sino American Yacht Industrial Company, Limited in Taiwan, who completed 200 examples of the design between 1974 and the end of production in 1984.

The Landfall 39 design was developed into the Vagabond 39, using the old Landfall 39 hull molds in 1984 and built by Bluewater Yachts Builders Limited, also of Taiwan.

Design
The Landfall 39 is a recreational keelboat, built predominantly of fiberglass, with wood trim. It has a cutter rig, a rounded raked stem, a canoe transom, a keel-mounted rudder controlled by a wheel and a fixed long keel. It displaces  and carries  of ballast.

The boat is fitted with a Nissan-Chrysler diesel engine.

See also
List of sailing boat types

References

Keelboats
1970s sailboat type designs
Sailing yachts
Sailboat type designs by Ron Amy
Sailboat types built by Sino American Yacht Industrial Company